Altellopsis is a genus of South American tangled nest spiders containing the single species, Altellopsis helveola. It was  first described by Eugène Simon in 1905, and has only been found in Argentina.

References

External links

Amaurobiidae
Monotypic Araneomorphae genera
Spiders of Argentina
Taxa named by Eugène Simon